Jesús Nazareno District is one of fifteen districts of the province Huamanga in Peru.

References